Bardejov Catechism is the translation of Luther's Small Catechism into the Slovak (Slovakized Czech) language. The book published by David Gutgesel in 1581 in Bardejov is the first known printed Slovak book. The catechism was probably translated by single translator, a native Slovak speaker, who preserved Slovak in all language layers (phonetic, grammar, lexemes). The translation testifies the awareness of Slovak Protestants about the Reformation in the German lands and the development of their belief.  The book is preserved in a single copy stored in the Slovak National Library in Martin.

References

Language
Slovak
Slovak language
Slovak literature